This is a list of episodes of the Chinese variety show Keep Running in season 7. The show airs on ZRTG: Zhejiang Television. The new season welcomed 4 new members: Zhu Yawen, Wang Yanlin, Lucas Wong and Song Yuqi.

Episodes

Notes

References

External links
Keep Running Official Homepage

Running Man (TV series)
2019 Chinese television seasons